The UK National Scrabble Championship (NSC) is a British national Scrabble tournament that has been held annually (except 1995, 2020 and 2021) since its inception in 1971. It was formerly organised by Mattel, the copyright owners of Scrabble in the UK, and has been organised by the Association of British Scrabble Players (ABSP) since 2014. It is one of five major tournaments in the UK, the other four being the UK Open, the British Isles Elimination Scrabble Tournament (BEST), the British Matchplay Scrabble Championship (BMSC) and the UK Masters. The current UK champion is Brett Smitheram.

History

In 1971, author and broadcaster Gyles Brandreth visited Bristol Prison whilst conducting research for a book and noticed the inmates playing Scrabble, at around the same time he also saw the Royal Family playing the game on a British TV documentary. He placed a small ad in The Times inviting anyone interested in taking part in a National Scrabble Championships to contact him. Hundreds replied and after hooking up with the game's owners at the time J. W. Spear & Sons, the Championships were born.

Stephen Haskell won the Championships in 1971 with an aggregate of 1345 points from 3 games. Regional qualifying events were introduced in 1976. The Championships continued to be decided by the 3 game cumulative score method until 1988. In 1989, a hybrid format was introduced, where the winner had to win all of his/her four games with the highest score possible. From 1990, the Championships have been exclusively 'play to win' format with no relation to points totals.

The format has changed a number of times over the years. The tournament comprises regional-qualifying processes. A Scrabble tournament is split into at least two divisions based on players' ratings, and leaderboards are determined by number of wins, then by accumulated points differences (called spread). In each one-day local tournament designated as an NSC qualifier, players who finish in the top 25% in the top division qualify, with decimals figures rounded to the nearest integer. For example, if there are 18 players, the top 5 will qualify (since 25% of 18 is 4.5, with the figure rounded up). In the second-highest division the top 10% qualify. Additionally, extra qualification places are allocated for players rated 170 or above.

Until 2013, qualifiers competed in a semi-final, held in another part of the UK, involving 60 qualifiers from 6 NSC qualifiers competing in a 14-game stage with the top two playing in a best-of-five final held in London. Since the replacement of the ABSP from Mattel as the sponsor of the NSC in 2014, qualifiers now compete in a 17-game final held over a weekend in November, with no best-of-5 final. The final, like a normal Scrabble tournament, orders players based on number of wins then by number of spread points. The player who finishes first after 17-games is crowned UK National Scrabble Champion and wins a cash prize of £1,000. Smaller cash prizes are also awarded to the top 10 players, plus a ratings prize for the player who improves their ABSP rating higher than all other players. In 2018 the finals were held in London.

The highest score under the cumulative score method was 1863 in 3 games by Nigel Ingham from Nottingham in 1987. The youngest champion was 15-year-old Allan Saldanha in 1993 and the oldest was 57-year-old Jake Jacobs in 2006, when the Championship featured in the BBC Four and subsequently BBC Two programme  Marcus Brigstocke's Trophy People. In 2012, Paul Gallen became the first player from Northern Ireland to win the title.

Winners of UK National Scrabble Championship

1971 : Stephen Haskell
1972 : Olive Behan
1973 : Anne Bradford
1974 : Richard Sharp
1975 : Olive Behan (2)
1976 : Alan Richter
1977 : Mike Goldman
1978 : Philip Nelkon
1979 : Christine Jones
1980 : Joyce Cansfield
1981 : Philip Nelkon (2)
1982 : Russell Byers
1983 : Colin Gumbrell
1984 : Mike Willis
1985 : Esther Byers (now Perrins)
1986 : Viraf Mehta
1987 : Nigel Ingham
1988 : Margaret Rogers
1989 : Russell Byers (2)
1990 : Philip Nelkon (3)
1991 : Phil Appleby
1992 : Philip Nelkon (4)
1993 : Allan Saldanha
1994 : Mike Willis (2)
1995 : no tournament
1996 : Andrew Fisher
1997 : Andrew Cook
1998 : Mark Nyman
1999 : Evan Simpson
2000 : Brett Smitheram
2001 : Mark Nyman (2)
2002 : Mark Nyman (3)
2003 : Harshan Lamabadusuriya
2004 : Mark Nyman (4)
2005 : Wale Fashina
2006 : Jake Jacobs
2007 : Paul Allan
2008 : Allan Simmons
2009 : Craig Beevers
2010 : Mikki Nicholson
2011 : Wayne Kelly
2012 : Paul Gallen
2013 : Paul Allan (2)
2014 : Chris May
2015 : Craig Beevers (2)
2016 : Phil Robertshaw
2017 : Austin Shin
2018 : Edward Martin
2019 : Phil Robertshaw (2)
2020 : no tournament
2021 : no tournament
2022 : Brett Smitheram (2)

References

External links
Mattel
Association of British Scrabble Players

Scrabble competitions
Competitions in the United Kingdom
1971 establishments in the United Kingdom
Recurring events established in 1971
Annual events in the United Kingdom
Scrabble in the United Kingdom
National championships in the United Kingdom